The American Institute of Chemists (AIC) is an organization founded in 1923 with the goal of advancing the chemistry profession in the United States. The institute is known for its yearly awards recognizing contributions of individuals in this field of work. 

The American Institute of Chemists Gold Medal, given since 1926, is the institute's highest award and is awarded annually to a person who has promoted activity of service to the science or profession of chemist or chemical engineer in the United States of America.

The Chemical Pioneer Award, first given in 1966, recognizes chemists or chemical engineers who have made outstanding contributions to advances in chemistry or the chemical profession.

Former Presidents of the Institute include Gustav Egloff who served from 1942 to 1946.

See Also
 American Chemical Society
 Royal Society of Chemistry

References

External links 

Chemistry organizations
1923 establishments in the United States
Scientific organizations established in 1923
Scientific organizations based in the United States